is a passenger railway station located in the city of Akashi, Hyōgo Prefecture, Japan, operated by the private Sanyo Electric Railway.

Lines

Station layout
The station consists of two unnumbered elevated side platforms connected by an underground passage. The station is unattended.

Platforms

Adjacent stations

|-
!colspan=5|Sanyo Electric Railway

History
It was closed on July 20, 1945 and reopened on November 15, 1947. It was renamed to its present name on April 7, 1991.

Passenger statistics
In fiscal 2018, the station was used by an average of 1,342 passengers daily (boarding passengers only).

Surrounding area
 Sumiyoshi Shrine (Sumiyoshi Park)
 Yakushi-in (Peony Temple)
 Nakao Water Park
 JR West Uozumi Station

See also
List of railway stations in Japan

References

External links

  Official website (Sanyo Electric Railway) 

Railway stations in Japan opened in 1923
Railway stations in Hyōgo Prefecture
Akashi, Hyōgo